The Dempsey TD-3 Beta Lightning is the second original homebuilt aeroplane design by Thomas Dempsey.

Design and development
The TD-3 was built with the design goals of being strong, comfortable and fast. The twin boom, twin engine design was loosely based on the Lockheed P-38 Lightning planform.

The TD-3 Beta Lightning is a twin boom, twin engine, tricycle gear monoplane with side-by-side configuration seating. The wooden spar wings are fabric covered. The fuselage pod is all fiberglass. The landing gear mechanism is sourced from a Piper Aztec, with the retraction mechanism retracting rearward rather than forward as on the Aztec. Four wing fuel tanks are mounted internally. The fuselage and tail booms have a supported welded steel tube frame with aluminum stringers.

Specifications (TD-3 Beta Lightning)

See also

References

Homebuilt aircraft